Cundari is a surname. Notable people with the surname include:

Emilia Cundari (1930–2005), American soprano opera singer
Mark Cundari (born 1990), Canadian ice hockey player
Thomas R. Cundari (born 1964), American professor

Italian-language surnames